HM Prison Geelong was a maximum security Australia prison located on the corner of Myers Street and Swanston Street in Geelong, Victoria, Australia. The prison was built in stages from 1849 to 1864. Its panopticon design is based on Pentonville Prison in England. The prison was officially closed in 1991 and prisoners were moved to the newly built HM Prison Barwon in Lara. The building now functions as a museum for the history of the prison.

History
The gaol was built by prisoners who slept on high security barges on Corio Bay during construction. The three-storey central block is cruciform with east and west wings serving as cells, the north wing as an administration block, and the southern wing as a kitchen, hospital and a tailoring workshop. The Australian Army used the prison as a detention barracks during, and for a few years after, World War II.

The government closed the gaol in 1991 and the site now operates as a museum. It is open to the public on Saturdays, Sundays and daily during public and school holidays. The gaol remains mostly unchanged. A gallows exhibit recreates the 1863 hanging of James Murphy, who battered Constable Daniel O'Boyle to death at the Warrnambool court house. He was the last person hanged at the gaol. Cell 47 is of special interest as it contains a mural painted on a wall by a prisoner, titled Window of Freedom.

The Gaol is now referred to as the "Old Geelong Gaol". Some believe the gaol may be haunted and several paranormal research groups have visited the site.

Timeline
 1853–1865 Gaol for convicts and prisoners
 1865–1872 Industrial school for girls (street kids)
 1877–1940 Hospital gaol
 1940–1947 Army detention barracks during World War II
 1947–1958 Hospital gaol
 1958–1991 Training prison
 2011-Current Guided tours (2021 1970’s buildings removed to return historic charm by Bayside Demolition   )

Notable prisoners
Frank McCallum (alias Captain Melville)Australian bushranger
James Murphykilled a police officer at Warrnambool Court House 
Mark "Chopper" Read
Angus Murray  an associate of gangster Squizzy Taylor who escaped in 1923 only to be executed for his role in a murder in Melbourne shortly after. He was in cell 74 and the hole in the floor that was caused when he dropped a brick upon leaving still remains.

Executions

Media
 2015 – It served as an All In Challenge location for FreshTV's Total Drama Presents: The Ridonculous Race.

See also
Everynight ... Everynight, a 1994 Australian film, filmed at the prison.
Marngoneet Correctional Centre, 300 bed prison in Lara, Victoria, opened in 2006.
Pirra Homestead
 The gaol is now open to the public. For more information see here: http://www.geelongcity.vic.gov.au/Visiting_Geelong/Attractions/Old_Geelong_Gaol/

References

Geelong
Geelong
Defunct prisons in Geelong
Prison Geelong
Geelong
Convictism in Australia